Air Chief Marshal Sir Ronald Ivelaw-Chapman,  (17 January 1899 – 28 April 1978) was a senior commander in the Royal Air Force in the middle of the 20th century and the penultimate RAF commander-in-chief of the Indian Air Force.

Early life and the First World War
Ronald Ivelaw-Chapman was born on 17 January 1899 in British Guiana. He came to England with his parents in 1903 and attended Cheltenham College. He joined the Royal Flying Corps in 1917 and served as a Bristol Fighter pilot on the western front with 10 Squadron in the last eleven months of the war.

Between the wars
In January 1929, then a flight lieutenant in the RAF, Ivelaw-Chapman participated in the Kabul Airlift, a successful evacuation of the British Legation in Kabul amidst a civil war and a bitter winter. On 27 January a Kabul-bound Vickers Victoria, piloted by Ivelaw-Chapman, was forced to make an emergency landing in the mountainous Surobi District. Rescued by an Afghan royalist officer, Ivelaw-Chapman was awarded the Air Force Cross for his handling of the incident.

Second World War
At the outbreak of the Second World War Ivelaw-Chapman, now a wing commander, was part of the operations staff of RAF Bomber Command headquarters. In June 1940 he was promoted to group captain and was appointed station commander at RAF Linton-on-Ouse, a No. 4 Group bomber station near York. In 1941 he returned to a staff job at the Air Ministry involved in D-Day planning. In 1943 he was again appointed a station commander at RAF Elsham Wolds, a No. 1 Group bomber station.

On the night of the 6/7 May 1944, Ivelaw-Chapman was flying as second pilot of a No. 576 Squadron Avro Lancaster on a mission to bomb an ammunition dump at Aubigne in France. His aircraft was shot down by a night fighter and Ivelaw-Chapman went on the run. Because of his experience and knowledge Churchill ordered the French resistance to do all they could to help him return to England, he was to be killed if he was in danger of being captured by the Germans. He was captured by the Gestapo on 8 June 1944, the most senior Bomber Command officer to have been captured by the Germans. Churchill's fear was unfounded as the Germans did not realise his importance and he was treated as an ordinary prisoner of war.

Post war
After the war Ivelaw-Chapman was promoted to air vice marshal and assumed command of No. 38 Group at Marks Hall, Earls Colne, Essex. In 1950 he became an air chief marshal and accepted the post of Commander-in-Chief of the newly formed Indian Air Force. On his return to the UK he became Air Officer Commanding-in-Chief at Home Command in March 1952, Deputy Chief of the Air Staff in November 1952 and Vice-Chief of the Air Staff in 1953 before he retired in 1957.

Family
In 1930 Ivelaw-Chapman married his fiancée Margaret.

References

Notes

Bibliography
 
 
 
 Air of Authority – A History of RAF Organisation – Air Chief Marshal Sir Ronald Ivelaw-Chapman

External links
 Air Chief  Marshal Sir Ronald Ivelaw-Chapman GCB KBE DFC AFC

|-

|-
 

|-

|-

1899 births
1978 deaths
British aviators
Knights Commander of the Order of the British Empire
Knights Grand Cross of the Order of the Bath
Recipients of the Air Force Cross (United Kingdom)
Recipients of the Distinguished Flying Cross (United Kingdom)
Royal Air Force air marshals
Royal Air Force personnel of World War I
Royal Air Force pilots of World War II
Royal Flying Corps officers
Shot-down aviators
World War II prisoners of war held by Germany
British World War II prisoners of war
Chiefs of Air Staff (India)